The Honda CRF150L is a CRF series  dual-sport motorcycle made by Astra Honda Motor, a subsidiary of Honda in Indonesia. It was unveiled in November 2017.  It shares an air-cooled 149 cc 4-stroke SOHC single-cylinder EFI engine with the Verza standard motorcycle.

Performance 

Some performance tests listed here were conducted by GridOto from Indonesia in December 2017.

References

External links 
 

CRF150L
Off-road motorcycles
Dual-sport motorcycles
Motorcycles introduced in 2017